World Of Thought is an album by Marzio Scholten which was released on October 1, 2010 on O.A.P. Records.

Guitarist Anton Goudsmit wrote the liner notes for 'World Of Thought': "Marzio Scholten gives the Netherlands claim to yet another masterful Jazz guitarist. His wonderful band - the powerful and perfectly intonated double bass of Stefan Lievestro, the subtle and driven playing of pianist Randal Corsen, the deep touch of drummer Bob Roos and the brilliant guest performances by trumpet player Ambrose Akinmusire and tenor saxophonist Yaniv Nachum - performs Marzio's mature music inspiringly, doing right to the lyrical and clearly phrased guitar playing of this great talent. The pieces on this album, all composed by the master himself, vary in approach and are related, soundwise, to New York City's modern jazz scene. Marzio's guitar playing is honest, graceful and very recognizable. Enjoy!"
 
All About Jazz published an excellent review and selected ‘World Of Thought’ as one of the best international releases of 2010. In the Netherlands ‘World Of Thought’ ended up in the Top 10 of Best Jazz Releases of 2010.

Track listing
Tricks - 7:32
Six Degrees of Separation - 8:08
Kismet - 8:44
Piano Intro To W.O.T. - 2:21
World Of Thought - 8:40
A Breath Of Love - 9:12
In The Machine - 7:25
The Puzzle - 9:09
Nebula - 6:24

All compositions by Marzio Scholten, except 'Piano Intro to W.O.T.' by Randal Corsen

Personnel
Marzio Scholten - Guitar
Yaniv Nachum - Tenor Saxophone (tracks 1, 5, 7, 8)
Ambrose Akinmusire - Trumpet (tracks 2, 6)
Randal Corsen - Piano
Stefan Lievestro - Double Bass
Bob Roos - Drums

References 

2010 albums
Marzio Scholten albums